Michael James "Mickey" O'Rourke  (March 19, 1878 – December 6, 1957), was an Irish-Canadian soldier and dockworker. O'Rourke was a recipient of the Victoria Cross, the highest, most prestigious decoration for gallantry in the face of the enemy that can be awarded to British and Commonwealth forces.

Early life 
There is little documentation of O'Rourke's life prior to World War I. Born in Limerick, Ireland, he served in the Royal Munster Fusiliers before emigrating to Canada where he joined the Canadian militia in Revelstoke, British Columbia. He also worked as a miner.

World War I 
O'Rourke joined the Canadian Expeditionary Force in February 1915. He had already been awarded the Military Medal for bravery at the Battle of the Somme when, as a member of the 7th (1st British Columbia) Battalion, the following action took place for which he was awarded the Victoria Cross.

During the period 15/17 August 1917 at Hill 17 near Lens, France, Private O'Rourke, who was a stretcher-bearer, worked unceasingly for three days and nights bringing in the wounded, dressing their wounds and getting them food and water. During the whole of this period the area in which he worked was swept by heavy machine-gun and rifle fire and on several occasions he was knocked down and partially buried by enemy shells. His courage and devotion in carrying out his rescue work in spite of exhaustion and incessant heavy fire inspired all ranks and undoubtedly saved many lives.

Later life 

After the war, O'Rourke went to California, then returned to British Columbia where he eked out an existence on Vancouver's skid road, surviving on a disability pension of 10 dollars per month and casual work on the docks. During the Vancouver longshoremen's strike of 1935, he headed a protest march of about 1,000 strikers, wearing his medals and carrying the Union Jack. The marchers attempted to pass a police line guarding the waterfront and were attacked with clubs and tear gas in what came to be known as the Battle of Ballantyne Pier.

O'Rourke's later life was complicated by war-related chronic health problems and alcoholism. He died as an indigent at a Veterans' Affairs facility in Burnaby, BC, on December 6, 1957. His grave is located at Forest Lawn Memorial Park in Burnaby.

References

Further reading 
The Register of the Victoria Cross (1981, 1988 and 1997)

Ireland's VCs  (Dept of Economic Development 1995)
Monuments to Courage (David Harvey, 1999)
Irish Winners of the Victoria Cross (Richard Doherty & David Truesdale, 2000)

External links
 Michael James O'Rourke's digitized service file
 Michael James O'Rourke biography 
 Legion Magazine Article on Michael James O'Rourke

1878 births
1957 deaths
Canadian Expeditionary Force soldiers
Canadian World War I recipients of the Victoria Cross
Irish World War I recipients of the Victoria Cross
Irish emigrants to Canada (before 1923)
Military personnel from County Limerick
People from Burnaby
Canadian recipients of the Military Medal
Royal Munster Fusiliers soldiers
Canadian military personnel of World War I